Noah Levine (born 1971) is an American Buddhist teacher and author, son of American Buddhist teacher and poet Stephen Levine. As a counselor known for his philosophical alignment with Buddhism and punk ideology, he identifies his Buddhist beliefs and practices with both the Theravada and Mahayana traditions. He has written several books on Buddhism and Buddhist practice including Refuge Recovery: A Buddhist Path to Recovering from Addiction.

Early life
Noah Levine is the son of American Buddhist author Stephen Levine. His parents had a history of addiction and, when he was very young, they divorced. He states he has had a "core distrust of authority" his whole life, which led him to reject the teachings of his father. At the age of five, Levine began exhibiting suicidal behavior and the next year began smoking marijuana. He discovered punk rock through the boyfriend of his older sister and the first time he heard the Sex Pistols "was like hearing the voice of God" because it expressed all the dissatisfaction he felt. His teenage years were filled with drugs, violence, multiple suicide attempts and detentions at juvenile halls, which was encouraged by the punk scene. In 1988 and after three felonies and one suicide attempt while jailed, he hit "an emotional rock bottom" and "realized" his addiction; in a desperate attempt to relieve his fear and uncertainty he tried to apply the anapanasati techniques his father taught him, and saw for the first time how this practice worked. Shortly afterward, he became highly involved in the straight edge scene (a hardcore punk associated movement whose members avoid drug and alcohol use), attended a twelve-step program and began a meditation practice.

He was trained by Jack Kornfield of Spirit Rock Meditation Center in Woodacre, California. Later, he earned a master's degree in counseling psychology from the California Institute of Integral Studies.

Career
He currently leads Dharma and vipassana meditation retreats and workshops across the United States and teaches weekly meditation classes at Against the Stream Meditation Center in Los Angeles. A member of the Prison Dharma Network, Levine works with juvenile and adult prison inmates, combining meditation techniques with principles from Western psychology. He "[explores] how they can have a deeper understanding of what has happened and what they need to do in order to be free, on many levels—free from prison, free from the trauma of the past."

He has helped found several groups and projects including the Mind Body Awareness Project, a non-profit organization that serves incarcerated youths, and Refuge Recovery, an addiction recovery community.

Allegations of Sexual misconduct
In March 2018, Against the Stream released a statement that they were investigating allegations of sexual misconduct on the part of Noah Levine. "It is with great regret we announce that we have received reports of sexual misconduct by Noah Levine which require an investigation. During the investigative process we are required to suspend Noah’s teaching activities with Against the Stream and his membership on the Board of Directors." Levine denied the accusations, stating in a letter to the community "This never happened."

The ATS Grievance Council retained attorney Roberta Yang to independently investigate the accusations against Levine. In August 2018, ATS released a statement announcing that Yang and the Board of Directors had concluded that the preponderance of evidence indicated that Levine had likely violated the Third Precept of the ATS Teacher's Code of Ethics, which requires teachers to "avoid creating harm through sexuality," with multiple women. Levine was removed from the ATS Board of Directors, and the Board announced that its centers in Melrose, Santa Monica, and San Francisco would close as a result of financial difficulties stemming from the allegations against Levine.

In a Facebook livestream shortly following the announcement of the closing of ATS, Levine clarified that there were no accusations from ATS students. 

The report prepared for ATS was leaked in fall 2018 and some details appeared to contradict Levine's claims.

On February 20, 2019, Spirit Rock Meditation Center's Ethics and Reconciliation Council released a statement that the organization and Dr. Jack Kornfield rescinded his authorization to teach. 
Spirit Rock had previously indefinitely suspended Levine from teaching there, pending the investigation by the ATS organization, which was founded by Levine. That investigation, completed in August, concluded that Levine had likely violated the Third Precept, “to avoid creating harm through sexuality” and was followed by the dissolution of ATS. The EAR Council then “conducted its own investigation, a long and careful process of collecting information from numerous sources in order to determine Mr. Levine’s fitness for teaching."

Bibliography

Subject of documentary
Levine is the subject of the feature-length documentary, Meditate and Destroy, directed by Sarah Fisher of Blue Lotus Films. The documentary was shown in film festivals and independent screenings from 2007 to 2008. Meditate and Destroy was released on DVD in 2009 by Alive Mind Media.

See also
 Vipassana movement

References

External links

 Noah Levine's Official Website
 Noah Levine audio from the DIY Dharma website
 Zen and the Art of Slam Dancing article by David F. Smydra, Jr. in the Boston Globe, 9/19/04.
 An article about sexuality and desire on the spiritual path featured in ascent magazine.
 An interview with ascent magazine.
 Audio Interview Series on Buddhist Geeks
 Meditate and Destroy- Documentary film website
 

American Buddhists
Living people
Buddhist writers
Theravada Buddhist spiritual teachers
1971 births
Punk people
Jewish American writers
American non-fiction writers
People from Santa Cruz, California
21st-century American Jews